Guzmania desautelsii is a species of Bromeliads in the genus Guzmania. A plant native to Costa Rica, Nicaragua and Panama, the species was originally described by Robert William Read and Lyman Bradford Smith in 1983

Description 
Guzmania desautelsii flowers at 20-30 cm high. The leaves of 30-70 cm grow in rose-like clusters and are greyish-purple to green. It was first described in 1983 as follows:

Distribution 
Occurrences of Guzmania desautelsii have been documented in Costa Rica and Panama. This range is also confirmed in records on the Global Biodiversity Information Facility and citizen science efforts

References

desautelsii
Flora of Central America
Plants described in 1983

Taxa named by Robert William Read
Taxa named by Lyman Bradford Smith